William Lathrop may refer to:

 William Lathrop (politician) (1825–1907), U.S. Representative from Illinois. 
 William Langson Lathrop (1859–1938), American landscape painter
 William Addison Lathrop, American author, playwright, and screenwriter
 Bill Lathrop (1891–1958), American baseball pitcher